The Gudvanga Tunnel ( or ) is located in the municipality of Aurland in Vestland county, Norway.  The tunnel connects the village of Gudvangen, at the head of the Nærøyfjord, with the Undredalen valley and is part of European Route E16.  At  in length, it is Norway's third longest road tunnel. It was opened on 17 December 1991.

Nearby tunnels
After passing through the Gudvanga Tunnel, drivers pass through a number of other tunnels. Approximately  after that tunnel is the  Fretheim Tunnel. This means that in a  section of the E16,  of that distance consists of tunnels.

Fires
In August 2013, a truck caught fire in the tunnel, resulting in 55 people being hospitalised. In August 2015, a tourist bus caught fire  from the exit.

References

External links
Photo with sign showing the length.
Road authority annual report. See page 25.

Aurland
Road tunnels in Vestland
1991 establishments in Norway
European route E16 in Norway
Tunnels completed in 1991